Walter Joseph Ciszek, S.J. (November 4, 1904 – December 8, 1984) was a Polish-American Jesuit priest of the Russian Greek Catholic Church who conducted  clandestine missionary work in the Soviet Union between 1939 and 1963.

Fifteen of these years were spent in confinement and hard labor in the Gulag, plus five preceding them in Moscow's infamous Lubyanka prison. He was released and returned to the United States in 1963, after which he wrote two books, including the memoir With God in Russia, and served as a spiritual director.

Since 1990, Ciszek's life has been under consideration by the Catholic Church for beatification. His current title is Servant of God.

Early life and studies
Ciszek was born on November 4, 1904, in the mining town of Shenandoah, Pennsylvania, to Polish immigrants Mary (Mika) and Martin Ciszek, who had emigrated to the United States in the 1890s from Galicia in Austria-Hungary. A former street gang member, he shocked his family by deciding to become a priest. Ciszek entered the Jesuit novitiate in Poughkeepsie, New York in 1928. The following year, he volunteered to serve as a missionary to Russia, where the Bolshevik Revolution had taken place 12 years before. Christians were being openly persecuted there, and few believers had access to a priest. Pope Pius XI made an appeal to priests from around the world to go to Russia as missionaries.

In 1934, Ciszek was sent to Rome to study theology and Russian, the history of Russia and liturgy at the Pontifical Russian College (or 'Russicum'), a Jesuit-run seminary established to train priests of the Russian Greek Catholic Church for missionary work in the Soviet Union and the Russian diaspora. 

His fellow Russicum seminarians included Alexander Kurtna, a convert from Estonian Orthodoxy whom Ciszek referred to in his memoirs only by the codename "Misha". Following his expulsion by the Russicum's Rector in 1940, Kurtna worked, with only one interruption, between 1940 and 1944 as a translator for the Vatican's Congregation for the Eastern Churches. During those same years, Kurtna covertly spied for the Soviet NKVD, with devastating results for Walter Ciszek and many other underground priests and faithful. Kurtna, who was always loyal to the USSR, only started spying for Nazi Germany in 1943 because his handler, SS Obersturmbannführer Herbert Kappler, threatened otherwise to send Kurtna and his wife to a concentration camp. Kurtna, however, turned the tables on Kappler by stealing the codebooks from his office and passing them to the Soviets. Ironically, Kurtna and Ciszek met one another again in 1948 as fellow political prisoners in Norillag.

In 1937, Ciszek was ordained a priest in the Byzantine Rite in Rome taking the name of Vladimir.

In 1938, Ciszek was sent to the Jesuit mission in Albertyn in eastern Poland. With the outbreak of World War II in 1939, the Soviet Union occupied eastern Poland and forced Ciszek to close his mission. Arriving in Lviv, he realized that it would be easy for a priest to enter the Soviet Union amid the streams of exiles going East. After securing the permission of Metropolitan Andrei Sheptytsky, he crossed the border in 1940 under the assumed identity of Władymyr Łypynski. With two of his fellow Jesuits, he traveled  by train to the logging town of Chusovoy, in the Ural Mountains. For one year, he worked as an unskilled logger while discreetly performing religious ministry at the same time.

Captivity in the Soviet Union

Ciszek was arrested in 1941 under false accusations of espionage for Nazi Germany and the Vatican. To Ciszek's shock, the NKVD already knew his real name and that he was an American citizen and a Catholic priest. He was then sent to the Lubyanka prison in Moscow, the national headquarters of the NKVD (secret police agency). He spent five years there, most of them in solitary confinement. In 1942, he signed a confession under severe torture to espionage and was sentenced to 15 years of hard labor in the GULAG.

Ciszek was to remain in Lubyanka for four more years. In 1946, he was sent by train to Krasnoyarsk then 20 days by boat north on the Yenisei River until reaching 300km above the Arctic Circle to the city of Norilsk, the center of the labor camp complex known as Norillag. There, Fr. Ciszek was forced to load coal onto freighter vessels and later transferred to working in coal mines located in the Permafrost. A year later, he was sent to work on the construction of a nickel, copper, cobalt, platinum, and palladium ore refinery. From 1953 to 1955, he worked in mines. His memoirs provide a vivid description of the Norilsk uprising, which started at Gorlag spread through Norillag in the aftermath of Joseph Stalin's death.

Throughout his lengthy imprisonment, Ciszek continued to pray, to offer both the Tridentine Mass and the Byzantine Rite Divine Liturgy, to hear confessions, conduct retreats and perform secret and illegal parish ministry. Until he was allowed to write to America in 1955, he was presumed dead by both his family and the Society of Jesus.

By April 22, 1955, Ciszek's hard labor sentence was complete, and he was released with the restriction to live only in the city of Norilsk. At this time, he was finally able to write to his sisters in the United States.

After setting up a Catholic parish in Norilsk, Ciszek was ordered by the KGB in 1958 to move to Krasnoyarsk, where he secretly established several nearby mission parishes. After the KGB learned of this, he was forcibly transferred to Abakan,  to the south, where he worked as an automobile mechanic for four more years. In 1963, he finally received a letter from his sisters in the US. Several months later,  the Soviet Union grudgingly decided to return him (and an American student Marvin W. Makinen) to the United States in exchange for two Soviet agents. Fr. Ciszek was not aware that U.S. Presidents Dwight D. Eisenhower and John F. Kennedy had both been demanding his repatriation since the arrival of his first letter to his sisters in 1955. He remained oblivious until he was flown to Moscow and delivered to an official of the US State Department, who told Fr. Ciszek that he was still an American citizen.

Release and later life

After nearly 23 years of imprisonment, Ciszek was released with American student Marvin Makinen on October 12, 1963. In exchange, the Soviets received GRU agents Ivan Dmitrievich Egorov and his wife Alexandra Egorova, whom the FBI had arrested for espionage in July 1963. 

In 1965, Ciszek began working and lecturing at the John XXIII Center at Fordham University (now the Center for Eastern Christian Studies at the University of Scranton in Scranton, Pennsylvania), counseling and offering spiritual direction to those who visited him.

On December 8, 1984, Ciszek died after many years of declining health and was buried at the Jesuit Cemetery in Wernersville, Pennsylvania.

Legacy
Nine audiotapes of interviews conducted with Ciszek (c. 1964) remain at archives in Georgetown University.

According to Fr. Constantin Simon, S.J., With God in Russia, Fr. Ciszek's memoir of his decades in the USSR, went through multiple editions in various languages, including French, German, Spanish, Italian, Dutch, Portuguese, Polish, and Slovak. Although it remains very popular reading among Catholics in North America, With God in Russia has never gained the same popularity in Europe, where Fr. Ciszek has always been eclipsed by a fellow Russicum graduate and Gulag survivor named Fr. Pietro Leoni.

In 1985, a Carmelite nun, Marija, who was the mother superior of a Ruthenian Rite Carmelite nunnery which Ciszek helped found, and which had been under his spiritual direction, began to petition for the formal Canonization of Fr. Walter Ciszek. In 1990, Bishop Michael Joseph Dudick of the Ruthenian Catholic Eparchy of Passaic, New Jersey, opened an official diocesan process of investigation for official recognition on the road to beatification. His Sainthood cause is currently being handled by the Diocese of Allentown, Pennsylvania.

The Walter Ciszek Prayer Circle continues to publicize and act to further his cause for Beatification.

Ciszek Hall at Fordham University in New York City is named after him. It currently houses Jesuit scholastics in the first stage of formal study for the priesthood. Additionally, a small room has been set aside in honor of Ciszek. It contains the (Latin) altar, sacred vessels, candlesticks, and crucifix Ciszek used, as well as a copy (in his hand) of his final vows and a photocopy of a letter to a friend containing spiritual advice. There is also a Ciszek Hall at the University of Scranton. Shenandoah, Pennsylvania, also has a school named Trinity Academy at the Father Walter J. Ciszek Education Center. Marquette University's Walter Ciszek Collection is named for him. Additionally, the council has sponsored an annual Ciszek Lecture at Marquette since 2002.

Quotes
"The power of prayer reaches beyond all efforts of man seeking to find meaning in life. This power is available to all; it can transform man's weaknesses, limitations, and his sufferings."
"Across that threshold I had been afraid to cross, things suddenly seemed so very simple. There was but a single vision, God, who was all in all; there was, but one will that directed all things, God's will. I had only to see it, to discern it in every circumstance in which I found myself, and let myself be ruled by it. God is in all things, sustains all things, directs all things. To discern this in every situation and circumstance, to see His will in all things, was to accept each circumstance and situation and let oneself be borne along in perfect confidence and trust. Nothing could separate me from Him because He was in all things. No danger could threaten me, no fear could shake me, except the fear of losing sight of Him. The future, hidden as it was, was hidden in His will and therefore acceptable to me no matter what it might bring. The past, with all its failures, was not forgotten; it remained to remind me of the weakness of human nature and the folly of putting any faith in self. But it no longer depressed me. I looked no longer to self to guide me, relied on it no longer in any way, so it could not again fail me. By renouncing, finally and completely, all control of my life and future destiny, I was relieved as a consequence of all responsibility. I was freed thereby from anxiety and worry, from every tension, and could float serenely upon the tide of God's sustaining providence in perfect peace of soul."
"His will for us was in the twenty-four hours of each day: the people, the places, the circumstances He set before us in that time. Those were the things God knew were important to Him and to us at that moment, and those were the things upon which He wanted us to act."

Books
 With God in Russia, (with Daniel L. Flaherty, S.J.), a memoir (New York: McGraw-Hill, 1964).
 He Leadeth Me, (with Daniel L. Flaherty, S.J.), a memoir (New York: Doubleday, 1973).
 "With God in America" (published posthumously), a memoir with primary sources (Chicago: Loyola Press, 2016).

References

External links

Details of Ciszek materials at Georgetown University library
Time Magazine 1963 story on the release of Walter Ciszek
Summary of the Writings of Walter Ciszek

1904 births
1984 deaths
People from Shenandoah, Pennsylvania
American Servants of God
Polish Eastern Catholics
American people of Polish descent
American Eastern Catholics
20th-century American Jesuits
Eastern Catholic writers
Roman Catholic writers
20th-century American memoirists
American male non-fiction writers
Anti-Catholicism in the Soviet Union
Victims of anti-Catholic violence
American people imprisoned abroad
American people imprisoned in the Soviet Union
20th-century venerated Christians
American expatriates in Russia
American expatriates in the Soviet Union
Foreign Gulag detainees
20th-century Eastern Catholic clergy
Jesuit Servants of God
Eastern Catholic Servants of God
Persecution by atheist states
Anti-Christian sentiment in Europe
Catholics from Pennsylvania
Participants in the Norilsk uprising